The Copi Nature Reserve (Dutch: Natuurreservaat Copi) is a protected area and nature reserve in Suriname. The reserve is located along the blackwater Cassewinica Creek. The reserve measures 18,000 hectares, and has been a protected area since 1986.

Overview
The reserve contains a large amount of possumwood (Hura crepitans) which was the main reason for protecting the area. It also contains numerous spectacled caimans (Caiman crocodilus crocodilus), some giant otters (Pteronura brasiliensis), and Cuvier's dwarf caimans (Paleosuchus palpebrosus).

The reserve consists of dry savannas, short grass savannas, and some grass and fern swamps. Copi Nature Reserve is the only state-owned dry clay savannah in Suriname; the other two are privately owned.

Access
The indigenous Lokono village of Copi is located in the area, however it only has a few inhabitants. The indigenous population has the right to fish and hunt in the reserve. Copi can be reached by boat from Stolkertsijver.

Archaeology
The Copi Nature Reserve contains archaeological traces from pre-Columbian times. There are also several abandoned plantations and forts located in the reserve.

References

Bibliography

Brokopondo District
Nature reserves in Suriname
Protected areas of Suriname